A.S.M. Matiur Rahman is a retired two star rank Bangladesh Army officer and Advisor of Caretaker Government led by Fakhruddin Ahmed. He has attended several conferences in counties around the world and was former health, water and religion minister of Bangladesh

Career
Rahman was a doctor who retired as a Major General of Bangladesh Army. He was the Health and Family Welfare Advisor of Caretaker Government led by Fakhruddin Ahmed. He resigned from his post in January 2017.  He is a part-time faculty in North South University.

References

Living people
Bangladesh Army generals
Advisors of Caretaker Government of Bangladesh
Year of birth missing (living people)